Krönlein may be,
 Krönleins Brewery
 Johann Georg Krönlein